Angoshteh (also Romanized as Āngoshteh) is a village in Bardesareh Rural District, Oshtorinan District, Borujerd County, Lorestan Province, Iran. At the 2006 census, its population was 410, in 87 families.

References 

Towns and villages in Borujerd County